Paralamyctes cassisi is a species of centipede in the Henicopidae family. It is endemic to Australia. It was first described in 2001 by palaeontologist Gregory Edgecombe.

Distribution
The species occurs in north-eastern New South Wales. The type locality is the Gibraltar Range National Park.

Behaviour
The centipedes are solitary terrestrial predators that inhabit plant litter and soil.

References

 

 
cassisi
Centipedes of Australia
Endemic fauna of Australia
Fauna of New South Wales
Animals described in 2001
Taxa named by Gregory Edgecombe